Ryan Andrew Cochrane (born October 29, 1988) is a retired Canadian competitive swimmer who specialised in freestyle distance events.  Cochrane is an Olympic silver and bronze medallist as well as a triple gold medallist from the Pan Pacific Swimming Championships. He is also a four-time Commonwealth Games champion in the 400-metre and 1,500-metre having won both medals in 2010 and 2014. He holds six world championship medals from the 800-metre and 1500-metre, this also makes Cochrane Canada's all-time leading medallist for a swimmer at the World Aquatics Championships. Cochrane also won gold medals in the 400 and 1,500 m freestyle at the 2015 Pan American Games in Toronto, as well as a bronze in the 4 x 200 m freestyle at the 2015 Games. From the year 2008 - 2015, Cochrane was named the Canadian male swimmer of the year - winning the award 8 times in a row.

Life and career
As a sixteen-year-old Cochrane competed at the 2005 Canada Games for British Columbia. In those games he won five medals including two gold in the 800- and 1,500-metre freestyle events. He rose to prominence in the Canadian sporting and aquatic world when he competed in the 2008 Summer Olympics starting in the 400 m freestyle. There he finished ninth in the heats with a Canadian record time of 3:44.85 and failed to qualify for the final. Cochrane also competed in the 1500 m freestyle where he briefly held the Olympic record after swimming a time of 14:40.84 in the heats. This record was soon broken by previous record holder Grant Hackett, who swam a time of 14:38.92. He qualified in second position for the final, and won the bronze medal on August 17. It was the first Olympic medal for a Canadian swimmer since the 1996 Summer Olympics. It was the first medal for Canada in the 1500m freestyle in 88 years.

Building on Olympic success
Cochrane was able to back up his performance from the Olympics at the 2009 World Aquatics Championships. There he swam to a bronze in the 800-metre freestyle and a silver in his best event the 1500-metre freestyle.

At the 2010 Commonwealth Games in Delhi, India, Cochrane won Canada's first gold medal of those games in the 400-metre freestyle during the first day of competition. Cochrane also became the first Canadian man in 72 years to win gold in the 400-metre freestyle at the Commonwealth Games. He then went on to win another gold medal at those games, this time in the 1500-metre freestyle.

Cochrane next competed at the 2011 World Aquatics Championships where he opened up with a fifth-place finish in the 400-metre freestyle. Next up was one of his medal hopeful events in the 800-metre freestyle where he lowered his Canadian record to 7:41.86. However this was only good enough for second, as despite staying close to the hometown favourite of Shanghai Sun Yang ultimately took the gold for China. Of the silver medal Cochrane said that "The goal was to win but I'm happy to progress from the last two years. It shows that I'm in it. I have a little more work to do to catch Sun Yang but I'm not out of it by any means."

He next competed in the 1500-metre freestyle in Shanghai where he again finished second behind Sun who swam to a world record time. Of a second finish behind Sun, Cochrane could only say that "He shows that he's had that much more base-work training and he can get to that world record, which is fantastic. I think it's great, especially for the distance events because everyone's been talking about this world record year after year and there's more pressure that's built up...He's showed amazing stroke and amazing ability."

The 2012 Summer Olympics began with Cochrane competing on the first day of competition in the 400-metre freestyle. There Cochrane won his heat and qualified in the last spot for the final. However, after Park Tae-hwan's disqualification was overturned, Cochrane was pushed out of the final and missed swimming in it by 1/100th of a second. He next entered his signature event the 1500-metre where he qualified through the heats in third place. In the final Cochrane managed to outswim Oussama Mellouli for the silver medal and achieved it in a personal best time. With his second medal at his second consecutive Olympics, according to media such as the CBC this cemented Cochrane as Canada's pillar athlete to build its swimming team around for the future as he declared that he would try and swim for Canada at the 2016 Summer Olympics in Rio de Janeiro.

Surpassing Hayden's World's medal tally
The post-London Olympics period saw Cochrane's first real test arrive at the 2013 World Aquatics Championships in Barcelona. He swam in the 400-metre and posted the second fastest time in qualifying, earning him one of the centre lane spots beside Sun. However, he finished fourth in the finals, unable to beat the American and Japanese swimmers. In the 800-metre freestyle, with Sun again far ahead, there was a four-way race for second through fifth. This time, Cochrane achieved a bronze medal (his fifth medal), tying the Canadian record held at the time by Brent Hayden.

Cochrane would later break Hayden's medal record in the 1500-metre race. In this event, he avoided the three and four-way races that he had found himself in the shorter events, taking a different approach that pitted him against Sun. Cochrane and Sun repeatedly took the lead from each other, culminating in Sun pulling ahead in the final 100 metres and took the gold. Although he established a new Canadian record, Cochrane still said that hoped to progress further, saying "This week was filled with ups and downs. I had expectations of myself that weren't met earlier on but I was pretty proud of my races later in the week so I'm going to take that going forward. Just to get on the podium twice is fantastic but I think I have that many more dreams of being that much better next time."

Glasgow, Scotland, was the location for the 2014 Commonwealth Games where Cochrane looked to defend both of his titles in the 400-metre and 1500-metre events. Cochrane won the 400-metre freestyle by half a second and after tying up after 1200 metre in the 1500-metre freestyle Cochrane wound up successfully defending this title by a safe margin as well. He stated that he believed these were one of his last major competitions and knowing that he could count his big races on one hand, pushed through the pain to the repeat double.

Swimming in the 400 m freestyle event at the 2015 World Aquatics Championships Cochrane surprised with a bronze medal in his shortest event, not normally his strongest event. Next in the 800 m freestyle event he surprised again, though this time negatively when he failed to qualify for the final in the event when seven swimmers went under 7:50. After he said "The distance events are getting faster and faster. The heats felt more like a semifinal. I thought I did enough to get into the final and I'm obviously disappointed." Despite this poor result Cochrane did follow up with another bronze in his preferred 1,500 m event, the last major event till the 2016 Summer Olympics.

He competed Canada's Olympic team at the 2016 Summer Olympics and was made co-captain of the team. These were to be Cochrane's last Olympic Games, though they would end in disappointment when he missed the final of the 400 m and finished sixth in the 1,500 m freestyle event.

Retirement from competitive swimming
On March 21, 2017, Ryan announced his retirement from competitive swimming during his "Player's Own Voice" segment on CBC Sports.

Personal bests and records held
Long course (50 m)

Short course (25 m)

See also
 List of Commonwealth Games medallists in swimming (men)
 List of Olympic medalists in swimming (men)

References

External links
 Biography at Swimming.ca
 
 

Living people
1988 births
Canadian male freestyle swimmers
Commonwealth Games gold medallists for Canada
Medalists at the 2008 Summer Olympics
Medalists at the 2012 Summer Olympics
Medalists at the FINA World Swimming Championships (25 m)
Olympic bronze medalists in swimming
Olympic bronze medalists for Canada
Olympic silver medalists for Canada
Olympic swimmers of Canada
Swimmers from Victoria, British Columbia
Swimmers at the 2008 Summer Olympics
Swimmers at the 2010 Commonwealth Games
Swimmers at the 2012 Summer Olympics
Swimmers at the 2014 Commonwealth Games
Swimmers at the 2015 Pan American Games
World Aquatics Championships medalists in swimming
Pan American Games gold medalists for Canada
Pan American Games bronze medalists for Canada
Swimmers at the 2016 Summer Olympics
Olympic silver medalists in swimming
Commonwealth Games medallists in swimming
Pan American Games medalists in swimming
Medalists at the 2015 Pan American Games
Medallists at the 2010 Commonwealth Games
Medallists at the 2014 Commonwealth Games